COVID-19 pandemic in Ireland may refer to:

 COVID-19 pandemic in the Republic of Ireland, the sovereign state
 COVID-19 pandemic in Northern Ireland, a country of the United Kingdom